Kevin O'Connor may refer to:

Arts and entertainment
 Kevin O'Connor (actor, born 1938) (1938–1991), American actor
 Kevin J. O'Connor (actor) (born 1963), American actor
 Kevin O'Connor (TV personality) (born 1968), host of This Old House
 Kevin O'Connor, fictional character on the American TV soap opera General Hospital
 Kevin O'Connor (musician), musician of the band Talkdemonic
 Kevin O'Connor (Reality TV), Amazing Race contestant

Politics and law
 Kevin J. O'Connor (attorney) (born 1967), American attorney
 Kevin O'Connor (Massachusetts politician), candidate for U.S. Senate from Massachusetts in 2020
 Kevin O'Connor (Minnesota politician), candidate for U.S. Senate from Minnesota in 2020

Sports
 Kevin O'Connor (hurler) (1923–2004), Irish hurler
 Kevin O'Connor (cricketer) (born 1940), New Zealand cricketer
 Kevin O'Connor (basketball) (born c. 1947), general manager of the Utah Jazz
 Kevin O'Connor (footballer, born 1982), English-born Irish football player for Brentford
 Kevin O'Connor (footballer, born 1985), Irish football player for Bray Wanderers
 Kevin O'Connor (footballer, born 1995), Irish football player for Preston North End

Others
 Kevin O'Connor (entrepreneur) (born 1961), American entrepreneur; co-founder of DoubleClick
 Kevin O'Connor (historian) (born 1967), American historian; professor at Gonzaga University
 Kevin O'Connor (physician), American osteopathic physician, U.S. Army colonel and physician to U.S. President Joe Biden